Carlos Alberto is a common Portuguese and Spanish given name (in English Charles Albert, in Italian Carlo Alberto).

It is the name of several people:

Musicians
 Braguinha (composer) (1907–2006), real name Carlos Alberto Ferreira Braga, Brazilian singer-songwriter, also known as "João de Barro"
 Charly García (born 1951), real name Carlos Alberto García, Argentine singer-songwriter
 Nito Mestre (born 1952), real name Carlos Alberto Mestre, Argentine musician

Politicians
 Carlos Alberto Arroyo del Río (1893–1969), 26th President of Ecuador 
 Carlos Alberto Baena López (born 1967), Colombian lawyer and politician
 Carlos Alberto Brenes Jarquín (1884–1942), Nicaraguan politician and former president of Nicaragua
 Carlos Alberto do Vale Gomes Carvalhas GCC (born 1941), Portuguese economist and politician
 Carlos Alberto Duque Jaén (1930–2014), Panamanian businessman and politician
 Carlos Alberto Flores Gutiérrez (born 1974), Mexican politician
 Carlos Alberto García González (born 1971), Mexican politician
 Carlos Alberto Lacoste (1929–2004), Argentine navy vice-admiral and politician
 Carlos Alberto Madero Erazo, Honduran politician
 Carlos Alberto Madrazo Becerra (1915–1969), reformist Mexican politician
 Carlos Alberto da Mota Pinto (1936–1985), Portuguese professor and politician
 Carlos Alberto Pérez Cuevas (born 1974), Mexican politician
 Carlos Alberto Puente Salas (born 1971), Mexican politician
 Carlos Alberto Richa (born 1965), Brazilian politician
 Carlos Alberto Torres Caro, Peruvian politician
 Carlos Alberto Torres Torres (born 1975), Mexican politician
 Carlos Alberto Brilhante Ustra (1932–2015), Brazilian army official and politician
 Carlos Alberto Torres (Puerto Rican nationalist) (born 1952), longest-serving Puerto Rican political prisoner

Sportspeople

Football
 Alfinete (born 1961), full name Carlos Alberto Dario de Oliveira, retired Brazilian footballer
Carlos Alberto (footballer, born 1932), full name Carlos Alberto Martins Cavalheiro, Brazilian football goalkeeper
 Betinho (footballer, born May 1987), full name Carlos Alberto Santos da Silva, Brazilian footballer
 Cabralzinho (born 1945), full name Carlos Roberto Ferreira Cabral, Brazilian football manager and former footballer
 Careca Bianchezi (born 1964), full name Carlos Alberto Bianchezi, Brazilian former footballer
 Carlos Alberto (footballer, born 1974), Carlos Alberto Ribeiro Pereira, Brazilian football defender
 Carlinhos (footballer, born 1980), full name Carlos Alberto de Almeida Junior, Brazilian midfielder for Bangu
 Carlinhos (footballer, born 1990), full name Carlos Alberto Rogger Dias, Brazilian footballer
 Carlitos (footballer, born 1921) (1921–2001), full name Carlos Alberto Zolim Filho, Brazilian footballer
 Carlitos (footballer, born 1982), full name Carlos Alberto Alves Garcia, Portuguese winger for FC Sion
 Carlos (footballer, born 1995), full name Carlos Alberto Carvalho da Silva Júnior, Brazilian forward for C.D. Santa Clara
 Carlos Alberto (footballer, born 1978), full name Carlos Alberto de Oliveira Júnior, Brazilian midfielder for Joinville
 Carlos Alberto (footballer, born 1980), full name Carlos Alberto dos Santos Gomes, Brazilian footballer
 Carlos Alberto (footballer, born 1984), full name Carlos Alberto Gomes de Jesus, Brazilian midfielder
 Carlos Alberto (footballer, born 1987), full name Carlos Alberto Gomes de Lima, Brazilian striker
 Carlos Alberto (footballer, born 1988), full name Carlos Alberto da Silva Gonçalves Júnior, Brazilian footballer
 Carlos Alberto (footballer, born 2002), full name Carlos Alberto Gomes da Silva Filho, Brazilian footballer
 Carlos Alberto Babington (born 1949), Argentine footballer
 Carlos Alberto Bulla (born 1943), Argentine footballer
 Carlos Campos (footballer, born 1992), full name Carlos Alberto Campos Ávila, Mexican footballer
 Carlos Alberto Lourenço Cardoso (born 1944), Portuguese football manager and former footballer
 Carlos Alberto Chacana (born 1976), Argentine footballer playing in Israel
 Carlos Alberto Cuevas Maldonado (born 1986), Mexican footballer
 Carlos Alberto de Toro (born 1963), Argentine footballer
 Carlos Alberto Costa Dias (born 1967), Brazilian footballer
 Carlos Alberto Díaz (born 1982), Colombian footballer
 Carlos Alberto Etcheverry D'Angelo (1933–2014), Argentine footballer
 Carlos Fernandes (footballer, born 1979), full name Carlos Alberto Fernandes, Angolan footballer
 Carlos Alberto García Charcopa (born 1978), Ecuadoran footballer
 Carlos Alberto Galeana Irra (born 1988), Mexican footballer
 Carlos Alberto Gutiérrez Armas (born 1990), Mexican footballer
 Carlos Alberto Hurtado Arteaga (born 1984), Mexican footballer
 Carlos Alberto Kiese Wiesner (born 1957), Paraguayan footballer
 Carlos Alberto Lugo Gamboa (born 1993), Mexican footballer
 Carlos Alberto Madeo (born 1981), Argentine footballer
 Carlos Alberto (footballer, born 1932) (1932–2012), Brazilian footballer
 Carlos Alberto Massara (born 1978), Argentine footballer who played in Greece
 Carlos Alberto Mayor (born 1965), Argentine football manager and former footballer
 Carlos Alberto Mijangos Castro (born 1951), Guatemalan football manager and former footballer
 Carlos Alberto Lourenço Milhazes (born 1981), Portuguese former footballer
 Carlos Alberto Palacio Quiñonez (born 1988), Colombian footballer
 Carlos Alberto Parreira (born 1943), Brazilian football manager
 Carlos Alberto Pavón Plummer (born 1973), Honduran footballer
 Carlos Alberto Peña Rodríguez (born 1990), Mexican footballer
 Carlos Alberto Pereira da Silva (born 1977), Brazilian footballer who plays in Paraguay
 Carlos Alberto (footballer, born 1973) (born 1973), Brazilian footballer
 Carlos Alberto Raffo (1926–2013), Argentine footballer
 Carlos Alberto Restrepo Isaza (born 1961), Colombian football manager
 Carlos Alberto Miguel Rodríguez (born 1990), Argentine footballer
 Carlos Alberto Rodrigues Gavião (born 1980), Brazilian footballer
 Carlos Alberto Rodríguez Gómez (born 1997), Mexican footballer
 Carlos Alberto Rodriguez Sanchez (born 1996), Mexican footballer
 Carlos Alberto Sánchez Moreno (born 1986), Colombian footballer
 Carlos Alberto Sánchez Romero (born 1980), Mexican footballer
 Carlos Alberto Souza dos Santos (born 1960), Brazilian retired footballer
 Carlos Alberto de Oliveira Secretário (born 1970), Portuguese retired footballer
 Carlos Alberto Silva (1939–2017), Brazilian football manager
 Carlos Alberto Silva Valente (born 1948), Portuguese referee
 Carlos Alberto (footballer, born January 1984) (born 1984), Brazilian footballer
 Carlos Alberto Tevez (born 1984), Argentine forward for Boca Juniors
 Carlos Alberto Torres (1944–2016), Brazilian footballer, 1970 World Champion
 Carlos Alberto Trejo Sánchez (born 1983), Mexican football goalkeeper
 Carlos Alberto Uribe (born 1969), Colombian footballer
 Carlos Alberto Valencia Paredes (born 1989), Colombian footballer 
 Carlos Alberto Valderrama Palacio (born 1961), Colombian footballer
 Carlos Alberto Vela Garrido (born 1989), Mexican footballer for MLS club Los Angeles FC
 Carli de Murga (born 1988), full name Carlos Alberto Martínez de Murga Olaivar, Filipino footballer
 China (footballer, born 1964), full name Carlos Alberto Gomes Kao Yien, Brazilian footballer of Chinese descent
 Duda (footballer, born 1974), full name Carlos Alberto Eduardo Ventura, Brazilian footballer
 Juninho (footballer, born 1977), full name Carlos Alberto Carvalho dos Anjos Junior, Brazilian footballer
 Manaca (born 1946), full name Carlos Alberto Manaca Dias, Mozambican footballer
 Mariano (footballer, born 1975), full name Carlos Alberto Teixeira Mariano, Portuguese former footballer
 Pintinho (born 1954), full name Carlos Alberto Gomes Montero, Brazilian footballer
 Zanata (born 1950), full name Carlos Alberto Zanata Amato, Brazilian footballer

Other sportspeople
 Carlos Alberto Abaunza (born 1959), Nicaraguan high jumper
 Carlos Alberto Arroyo Bermúdez (born 1979), Puerto Rican basketball player
 Carlos Alberto Batres González (born 1968), Guatemalan football referee
 Carlos Alberto Berlocq (born 1983), Argentine tennis player
 Carlos Alberto Betancur Gómez (born 1989), Colombian road cyclist
 Carlos Alberto Bonacich (born 1931), Argentine swimmer
 Carlos Alberto Casal (born 1946), Uruguayan boxer
 Carlos Alberto Contreras (born 1973), Colombian cyclist
 Carlos Alberto Cunha (born 1959), Brazilian judoka
 Carlos Gastélum (born 1979), Mexican baseball player
 Carlos Alberto de Sousa Lopes (born 1947), Portuguese long-distance runner
 Carlos Alberto Martínez (born 1957), Argentine alpine skier
 Carlos Alberto Maya Lizcano (born 1972), Venezuelan cyclist
 Carlos Alberto Moratorio (1929–2010), Argentine equestrian
 Carlos Alberto Pascual Lus (1931–2011), Cuban baseball pitcher
 Carlos Alberto Ramírez Yepes (born 1994), Colombian BMX rider
 Carlos Alberto Reutemann (born 1942), Argentine former racing driver and politician
 Carlos Alberto Silva Silva (born 1974), Colombian cyclist
 Carlos Alberto Taylhardat (1921–2011), Venezuelan naval captain and diplomat
 Carlos Alberto Tomasi (born 1930), Argentine bobsledder
 Carlos Alberto Urán (born 1980), Colombian cyclist
 Carlos Alberto Valderrama Cordero (born 1977), Venezuelan former baseball player
 Carlos Alberto Vario (born 1947), Argentine former wrestler
 Carlos Alberto Vázquez (born 1934), Argentine former cyclist
 Carlos Alberto Zambrano (born 1981), Venezuelan baseball player

Other people
 Carlos Alberto de Barros Franco (born 1946), Brazilian physician
 Carlos Alberto Cruz Boix (born 1949), Cuban artist
 Carlos Alberto Cabral, 2nd Count of Vizela, Portuguese nobleman
 Carlos Alberto Cardona Ospina (born 1974), Colombian internet entrepreneur
 Carlos Alberto Menezes Direito (1942–2009), Brazilian judge
 Carlos Alberto Gonçalves da Cruz (born 1944), Brazilian herpetologist
 Carlos Alberto Guajardo Romero (1973–2010), Mexican journalist
 Carlos Alberto Leumann (1886–1952), Argentine writer and poet
 Carlos Alberto Montaner (born 1943), Cuban author based in Madrid and Miami
 Carlos Alberto Pellegrini, Argentine surgeon based in Seattle
 Carlos Alberto Reis de Paula (born 1944), Brazilian judge
 Carlos Alberto Rentería Mantilla (born 1945), Colombian former narcotrafficker
 Carlos Alberto Ricardo, Brazilian environmentalist
 Carlos Alberto Riccelli (born 1946), Brazilian actor
 Carlos Alberto Rosales Mendoza (1963–2015), Mexican former drug lord
 Carlos Alberto Sacheri (1933–1974), Argentine philosopher
 Carlos Alberto dos Santos Cruz (born 1952), Brazilian military officer
 Carlos Alberto Seguín (1907–1995), Peruvian physicist
 Carlos Alberto Sicupira (born 1948), Brazilian businessman
 Carlos Alberto Torres (sociologist) (born 1950), professor of social science at UCLA

See also
 Caçador Airport, also known as Carlos Alberto da Costa Neves Airport; based in Caçador, Brazil
 
 Carlos (disambiguation)
 Alberto (disambiguation)
 Carlo Alberto (disambiguation)
 Carl Albrecht (disambiguation)

Portuguese masculine given names
Spanish masculine given names